The 2020 United States presidential election in Maryland was held on Tuesday, November 3, 2020, as part of the 2020 United States presidential election in which all 50 states plus the District of Columbia participated. Maryland voters chose electors to represent them in the Electoral College via a popular vote, pitting the Republican Party's nominee, incumbent President Donald Trump, and running mate Vice President Mike Pence against Democratic Party nominee, former Vice President Joe Biden, and his running mate California Senator Kamala Harris. Maryland has 10 electoral votes in the Electoral College.

Biden easily carried Maryland 65.4% to 32.2%, a margin of 33.2%, better than Hillary Clinton's 26.4% in 2016. Prior to the election, all news organizations considered Maryland "Safe Biden". Maryland has been a Democratic stronghold since 1992. Biden carried Montgomery, Prince George's, Howard, and Baltimore counties, and the city of Baltimore, with 78.6%, 89.3%, 70.7%, 62.3%, and 87.3% of the vote, respectively. He continued the Democrats' longstanding dominance of the Baltimore-Washington axis. While Republicans typically win more counties by running up huge margins in more rural western Maryland and the Eastern Shore, the Baltimore-Washington area casts over three-fourths of the state's vote, making it extremely difficult for a Republican to carry Maryland, and the 2020 election was no different. While Trump won 14 of Maryland's 24 county-level jurisdictions, Biden won the six largest jurisdictions, all of which are part of the Baltimore-Washington area–Montgomery, Prince George's, Anne Arundel, Howard and Baltimore counties and Baltimore City–by over a million votes, more than enough to carry the state.

Per exit polls by the Associated Press, Biden's strength in Maryland came from 94% of African-Americans, who represented 28% of the electorate. 74% of voters believed the criminal justice system needed a complete overhaul or major changes, and they opted for Biden by 73%. Biden won all other demographic groups; winning 52% of Whites, 69% of Latinos, 79% of Jews, 54% of Protestants, and 51% of Catholics. 

Biden flipped the Washington, D.C.-area exurban county of Frederick County, as well as Talbot County—home to Easton—Democratic for the first time since 1964. He also flipped Kent County, located on the Eastern Shore, voting Democratic for the first time since 2008. In a third county on the Eastern Shore, Wicomico, Biden failed to prevail but nevertheless held Trump to the first plurality (rather than majority) win for a Republican nominee since 1996.

Biden's performance was the strongest in Maryland since fellow Democrat Horatio Seymour did marginally better in 1868. In terms of statewide vote share, Trump performed worse than any Republican since 1912, when the national Republican vote was split by former President Theodore Roosevelt's third-party run against both President William Howard Taft and New Jersey Governor Woodrow Wilson. Even landslide losers Herbert Hoover in 1932, Alf Landon in 1936, and Barry Goldwater in 1964 managed higher vote shares than Trump's 32.15%. Apart from 1912, only in the antebellum elections of 1856 and 1860 did the Republican nominee perform worse in the state than Trump did in 2020.

All but one county in the state swung to the left, the lone exception being Somerset County which shifted right by 3.19%. The Republican presidential vote share has now declined for four elections in a row in the Old Line State, the longest such run of declines for either party in any state. It was also one of five states in the nation in which Biden's victory margin was larger than 1 million raw votes, the others being California, New York, Massachusetts and Illinois.

Primary elections
The primary elections were originally scheduled for April 28, 2020. On March 17, they were moved to June 2 due to concerns over the COVID-19 pandemic.

Republican primary
Donald Trump won the Republican primary, and thus received all of the state's 38 delegates to the 2020 Republican National Convention.

Democratic primary

Green primary

General election

Predictions

Polling

Graphical summary

Aggregate polls

Polls

with Donald Trump and Michael Bloomberg

with Donald Trump and Pete Buttigieg

with Donald Trump and Tulsi Gabbard

with Donald Trump and Amy Klobuchar

with Donald Trump and Bernie Sanders

with Donald Trump and Tom Steyer

with Donald Trump and Elizabeth Warren

with Donald Trump and Generic Democrat

Results

Results by county

Counties that flipped from Republican to Democratic
Frederick (largest municipality: Frederick)
Kent (largest municipality: Chestertown)
Talbot (largest municipality: Easton)

Results by congressional district
Biden won 7 of the state's 8 congressional districts.

See also
 United States presidential elections in Maryland
 2020 United States presidential election
 2020 Democratic Party presidential primaries
 2020 Republican Party presidential primaries
 2020 United States elections

Notes

References

Further reading

External links
 
 
  (state affiliate of the U.S. League of Women Voters)
 

Maryland
2020
Presidential